Nock may refer to:

Archery
 In a bow and arrow, two notches near the bow's respective ends, for attaching the bowstring 
 Nock (arrow), in an arrow, the notch in the fletched (feathered) end of the arrow, for engaging the bowstring

People
Henry Nock (1741–1804), British gunsmith, founder of Wilkinson Sword
David Nock (1829–1909), politician in South Australia
William Nock (cricketer) (1864–1909), West Indian cricketer
Albert Jay Nock (1873–1945), American author
Arthur Darby Nock (1902–1963), English classical scholar and theologian
O. S. Nock (1905–1994), British engineer and railway historian
Bello Nock (born 1968), American circus performer

Other uses
 Nock gun, a seven-barrelled volley gun
 National Oil Corporation of Kenya
 Nock, a low-level functional programming language used in Urbit

See also
 Knock (disambiguation)
 Nauck (disambiguation)
 NOK (disambiguation)